Schaerbeek/Schaarbeek railway station is a railway station in the municipality of Schaerbeek, Brussels-Capital Region, Belgium.

Located to the north-east of the centre of Brussels, the station mainly serves trains travelling between central Brussels and Leuven, Antwerp or Brussels National Airport.
On these routes it is the first station trains pass through after the North-South connection (North, Central and South stations). Although only local trains stop at Schaerbeek, the station also serves as a terminus for a number of interregional and peak-hour services. As it connects both to the North–South connection and to line 28 through Brussels-West station, it is the point at which trains can be rerouted to reverse direction.

The station is relatively large, with 13 platforms, numbered from 3 to 15. Tracks 1 and 2 were used in the past for motorail services carrying passenger cars to destinations mainly in southern France. These were transferred to Denderleeuw station in 2000, and eventually discontinued in 2003. Schaerbeek station lies to the south-west of extensive railway grounds including a goods station and a traction workshop.

The station building in Flemish Neo-Renaissance style was designed by architect Franz Seulen and built in two phases: the left wing around 1890, the main (right) wing in 1913. The building was listed as a monument by the Brussels Capital Region in 1994 and the facades have been restored. Before its closure in 2013 the building was largely disused though ticket counters were open for a limited time every weekday and concessions had been closed since the demise of the motorail services. Today, the station is unstaffed with ticket machines at the entrance.

The square in front of the station serves as terminus for tram route 92 as well as bus route 69. Bus routes 58 and 59 also stop at Schaerbeek railway station.

Train World, the new national railway museum of Belgium, is located at Schaarbeek railway station incorporating the station building, and was open to the public for the first time on Friday 25 September 2015, having been formally opened the previous day by HM King Philippe. So far EUR 20.5 million has been invested into the project, which plans to attract 100,000 visitors per year from its third year of operations onwards.

Train services
The station is served by the following service(s):

Brussels RER services (S1) Antwerp - Mechelen - Brussels - Waterloo - Nivelles (weekdays)
Brussels RER services (S1) Antwerp - Mechelen - Brussels (weekends)
Brussels RER services (S2) Leuven - Brussels - Halle - Braine-le-Comte
Brussels RER services (S6) Schaarbeek - Brussels - Halle - Geraardsbergen - Denderleeuw - Aalst
Brussels RER services (S81) Schaarbeek - Brussels-Luxembourg - Etterbeek - Ottignies (weekdays, peak hours only)

References

Railway stations in Brussels
Schaerbeek
Railway stations opened in 1887